"Love at First Sight" is a song by Styx. It was released in 1991 as the third single from their 1990 album Edge of the Century.

It is the band's last Top 40 hit on the Billboard Hot 100 (and their last entry to date), peaking at No. 25 on the week of June 15, 1991.  The song also fared moderately well on the Adult Contemporary chart, peaking at No. 13.

Chart performance

References

1989 songs
1991 singles
Styx (band) songs
Songs written by Glen Burtnik
Songs written by Dennis DeYoung
Songs written by James Young (American musician)
A&M Records singles